Çalıkağıl is a village in the Yayladere District, Bingöl Province, Turkey. The village is populated by Kurds of the Maskan tribe and had a population of 105 in 2021.

Tha hamlets of Alpekmez, Dikilitaş, Dirik, Kayaca, Kel, Kırkağaç, Oymataş, Tekke and Yediveren are attached to the village.

References 

Villages in Yayladere District
Kurdish settlements in Bingöl Province